Eudice Chong (born 22 April 1996) is a professional tennis player from Hong Kong. Chong has thus far captured four singles and 23 doubles titles on the ITF Women's Circuit. In 2022, she reached career-highs in both singles and doubles when her WTA rankings peaked at No. 219 and No. 136 in October 2022, respectively.

She embarked on a career as a full-time touring professional in June 2018 after she graduated from Division III Wesleyan University in Connecticut where she became the first player in NCAA history to win four consecutive national singles titles at any division of collegiate tennis, man or woman.

At the World University Games in Naples, Italy, in 2019, Chong captured a bronze medal in women's singles and women's doubles. In the process, she became the first tennis player from Hong Kong to medal in singles and the first to capture two tennis medals at the same Universiade.

An Elite Training Grant (ETG) recipient, her training is primarily based at the Hong Kong Sports Institute (HKSI) in Shatin. She is currently coached by former Indian Davis Cupper and 2010 Asian Games bronze medallist, Karan Rastogi, while her physical coach is Romain Deffet, former personal trainer to Li Na, Daniela Hantuchova, and Peng Shuai. In March 2019, Chong, together with fellow Fed Cup teammate, Cody Wong, were the first players selected to the EFG HKTA Tour Team, a three-year financial commitment by the EFG Young Athletes Foundation (YAF) to support local talent.

She represented Hong Kong at the Asian Games (2014 and 2018), All China Games (2013, 2017 and 2021), Asian Championships (2013), World University Games (2015, 2017, and 2019), and Fed Cup (2012-2014, 2017-2019, 2022).

With the global pandemic adversely impacting the ITF Women's World Tennis Tour, the latter part of 2020 saw Chong make a concerted assault on the local majors in Hong Kong.  She became the first player to equal Paulette Moreno's feat of winning the ladies' singles, ladies' doubles, and mixed doubles titles simultaneously at both the CRC Open and the Hong Kong National Tennis Championships in the same calendar year, a record that had stood untouched for 36 years.

Early life and personal feats
Chong was born in Long Island, New York. At age 3, she relocated to Hong Kong where her formative years of schooling and development in tennis took shape. Her earliest experience with the sport came in the form of once-a-week private lessons at a local tennis club, but genuine enthusiasm did not surface until the coach enrolled her for organized tennis with HKTA. She started competing in Junior Novice competitions in fifth grade in 2006 and won the Comp 3 under-10 and Comp 4 under-12 singles before attending the Talent Group trials that earned her a selection.

She then captured the under-12 girls' singles title at the Hong Kong National Junior Tennis Championships 2008 by beating Caroline Lampl, who went on to win three NCAA championships with Stanford University.  At age 16, Chong added the Hong Kong National Junior Tennis Championships 2012 under-18 girls' singles title.  In 2010 and 2011, she claimed back-to-back CRC Open 18 & Under School Girls' Open Singles Championship titles. She was selected to represent Hong Kong in the under-14 WJT events in 2010 and 2011, as well as the under-16 Junior Fed Cup competitions in 2012 and 2013.  With academics being first priority, Chong competed on a limited schedule on the ITF Junior Circuit but nevertheless captured two singles and seven doubles titles and peaked at a career-high No. 200 (6 January 2014) in the world.

In 2020, Chong was one of two local sportswomen featured in the October issue of Prestige Hong Kong magazine.

Collegiate years
When Chong arrived in Connecticut in 2014, Wesleyan had only made it to the NCAA tournament just once in its program's 42-year history. Moreover, the school had yet to produce an individual national champion. In her freshman year, Chong defeated Joulia Likhanskaia (Bowdoin College), 6-4, 4-6, 7-5, to win the NCAA Division III women's singles championship. In 2016, she beat Juli Raventos (Williams College), 6-2, 7-5, to repeat as champion. In 2017, Chong saw off the challenge of Rebecca Ho (Washington University in St. Louis), 6-4, 2-6, 6-2, to three-peat. Then, in her senior year in 2018, she defeated Victoria Yu (Wesleyan University), 7-6, 6-2, to become the first player in college tennis history to capture four straight singles titles in any division.

Chong then garnered the prestigious Division III Honda Athlete of the Year Award to conclude a stellar college career. The Honda Award honors the nation's top women in collegiate sports in recognition of their superior athletic skills, leadership, academic excellence, and eagerness to participate in community service. Inaugurated in 1976 for Division I athletes, followed by Divisions II and III in 1988, Chong is only the third tennis player in history to receive the Honda Athlete of the Year Award accolade among all divisions. "It is such an amazing honor to be receiving such a prestigious award, and these chances only come once in a lifetime!" exclaimed Chong. "Receiving this award means especially more because it shows that I've made an impact in some way or other throughout my collegiate career, and that I finished my four years giving it everything I've got. As an athlete of any sport, it means so much to see your hard work recognized, and in my case, I am lucky enough to be surrounded by people who have helped me get where I am and who continue to provide unwavering support."

Chong was presented with this honor at THE Collegiate Women Sports Awards (CWSA) presented by Honda that was telecasted live on the CBS Sports Network on June 25, 2018 from the Founders' Room at the Galen Center on the campus of the University of Southern California in downtown Los Angeles. The honor was voted on by national balloting among 1,000 NCAA member schools as part of the Collegiate Women Sports Awards program since 1976.
She was named Division III ITA National Senior Player of the Year and finished her career at Wesleyan as the all-time leader in singles wins, in addition to her four first-team All-Americas in both singles and doubles, and three NESCAC Player of the Year honors.  Chong also led her team to three consecutive NCAA tournaments from 2016-2018. In 2015, her freshman year, Chong became the first Wesleyan women's tennis player in program history to compete in the individual NCAA Championships.

All four years, she held the year-end Division III No. 1 ranking and was a four-time selection to the ITA Collegiate All-Star Team, which featured the nation's top-ranked men and women from the year-end Oracle/ITA Collegiate Tennis Rankings, in addition to winners of the Oracle ITA National Fall Championships and NCAA Division I and III Championships.

"She's a game changer in every sense of the expression," Wesleyan head coach Mike Fried said. "It's been really exciting to see the changes around the campus not only facility wise, but in terms of excitement about what she's doing individually and what we're doing as a team. Over her four years at Wesleyan, she established herself as one of the most accomplished NCAA Division III athletes ever, and she did so with an extraordinary amount of grace, sportsmanship and humility."

"Over the past four years she has provided the foundation which has enabled us to build a national caliber tennis program at Wesleyan. Everyone she has come in contact with during her time at Wesleyan appreciates her passion and commitment and feels fortunate to have had the opportunity to support her during her historical collegiate career," enthused Wesleyan Athletics Director, Mike Whalen. "She's someone that comes to a program maybe once in a lifetime. We recognize that and Wesleyan is a better place because Eudice is on our campus and her contributions both on and off the court will be a part of our tennis program for many years to come."

Prior to Chong's exploits, Principia's Courtney Allen (1984–85), Menlo's Caroline Bodart (1988–89), Methodist's Elena Blanina (2001–02), and Emory's Mary Ellen Gordon (2003–04) were the only players to win two successive Division III women's singles titles.  In Division I, Patty Fendick (Stanford, 1986–87), Lisa Raymond (Florida, 1992–93), Laura Granville (Stanford, 2000–01), Amber Liu  (Stanford, 2003–04), and Nicole Gibbs (Stanford, 2012–13) were the only players who managed back-to-back singles titles.

The only player in college history with three consecutive national singles titles was Malcolm Chace in Division I where he claimed men's singles in 1893 representing Brown and again in 1894 and 1895 when he played for Yale.

At the 2017 ITA Oracle Cup (formerly the ITA National Small College Championships) at Indian Wells, Chong defeated Ysabel Gonzalez Rico (Emory), 7-6, 6-2, to win the Division III women's singles and then teamed up with Victoria Yu (Wesleyan) to beat Ysabel Gonzalez Rico and Bridget Harding (Emory), 6-1, 6-1, to win the Division III women's doubles. The duo then saw off NAIA champions Megan Bianco and Daniela Farfan (Keiser), 6-1, 6-2, and Division II winners Hanna Volikova and Alina Kislitskaya (Indianapolis), 6-4, 6-2, to win the Women's Doubles Championship, which automatically secured them a berth in the ITA Fall National Championships.

At the Oracle ITA National Fall Championships, Chong and Yu then knocked out No. 6 seed Jessie Aney and Alexa Graham (North Carolina), 6-3, 6-3, in the opening round and then eliminated another Division I pair, Mami Adachi and Akvile Parazinskaite (Kentucky), 6-2, 5-7, [10-8], before they were upended by Alexa Bortles and Arianne Hartono (Ole Miss), 6-2, 6-2, in the quarterfinals. Hartono, as it turned out, would go on to win the 2018 NCAA Division I singles title.

At the 2015 USTA/ITA National Small College Championships, Chong defeated Ashnaa Rao (Johns Hopkins), 6-1, 6-1, to win the Division III women's singles and then partnered teammate Victoria Yu to beat Bridget Harding and Katarina Su (Emory), 6-0, 6-1, to claim the doubles.

Chong graduated from Wesleyan University with a Psychology major and a minor in Asian Studies. A number of Division I schools, including Harvard, Dartmouth, and Georgetown showed interest in her early in the recruitment process, but her motivation to experience the unique and academically challenging college life of a small liberal arts school eventually saw her commit to Wesleyan.

Serving the local community featured prominently on her already loaded college calendar, as she found time for the Wesleyan Leadership Committee of Student Athletes of Color, Leadership Committee of Mabuhay (Annual Pan-Asian Culture Show), and was co-president of the Hong Kong Student Association. She also volunteered weekly at a local Assisted Living facility and facilitated a new partnership with the Goals for Girls program from Reclaim Childhood and the women's tennis team.

"On the tennis court, I've become so much tougher. I've been able to show this grit, making every point and every match count. I've been able to focus harder on each ball I hit—as well as becoming more patient and confident," said Chong. "Off the court, I've been able to better understand my identity and develop my character, through taking a huge variety of classes and becoming close friends with people from many different backgrounds. I am now able to step out of my own shoes in order to be more understanding of the people around me."

Professional career

Hong Kong Tennis Open
Chong made her debut in 2016 when she was awarded a wildcard for the qualifying draw. With a modest WTA ranking of No. 995, she managed to come from a set down to beat 201st-ranked Shuko Aoyama, 4-6, 6-4, 6-1, before she was ousted by No. 164 Tereza Martincová of the Czech Republic. In 2018, now ranked No. 590, she was given a maindraw wildcard and faced 145th-ranked American Christina McHale. Trailing by a break and 5-3, Chong rallied to win three games in succession to force a tiebreak before claiming seven points in a row from 2-0 down to grab the breaker. However, the former world No. 24 made the necessary adjustments and tidied up her wayward groundstrokes to progress, 6-7, 6-2, 6-1.

Chong: "I played well in the first set and managed to stay with her in the rallies. For the second and third sets, I started rushing too much and went for shots that I shouldn't have and that definitely made a difference. Hopefully, I can use this experience and gain confidence for the upcoming tournaments I'm playing in." She also competed in the doubles and was given a main-draw wildcard in 2016 (w/ Katherine Ip) and 2018 (w/ Zhang Ling) but went out in the first round to Nao Hibino / Alexandrina Naydenova and Alizé Cornet / Zheng Saisai, respectively.

ITF World Tennis Tour

By the time, Chong turned pro in June 2018 following her college graduation, she had already won her maiden singles title at the $15k Anning in 2017 and her career-first doubles title at the ITF Hong Kong in 2016, partnering Katherine Ip. Since then, she has amassed a total of two singles and ten doubles titles on the pro circuit. In 2019 alone, she captured six $25k doubles titles, the most by any Hong Kong player on the pro circuit. All through her travels on the tour, she has picked up titles in China, Hong Kong, Uzbekistan, Japan, and Thailand.

Since coming back after COVID-19 pandemic in Oct 2021, Chong has won a total of thirteen doubles and two singles title with a 68-9 win–loss record in doubles. From November 2021 to February 2022, she established a 25 game-winning streak in women's doubles with six titles, and obtained four consecutive $25k titles in Monastir, Tunisia within a month. In April 2022, Chong won her first $25k singles title in Nottingham. Chong has a 50-4 record with Cody Wong in doubles, winning a total of 10 titles, from January to April 2022 they keep a 28 game-winning streak with seven titles, including a $60k title in Pretoria.

ITF finals

Singles: 10 (4 titles, 6 runner–ups)

Doubles: 36 (23 titles, 12 runner–ups, 1 cancelled)

Grand Slam tournament performance timeline

Singles

National representation

Fed Cup
Chong made her Fed Cup debut at age 15 against Sri Lanka at the 2012 Asia/Oceania Group II qualifying in Shenzhen. She was also nominated in 2013, 2014, 2017, 2018, 2019 and 2022. She competed in a total of 25 ties and has an overall 22-9 win–loss record, going 15-5 in singles and 7-4 in doubles. Her total of 22 victories places her third all-time behind only Zhang Ling (37-26) and Tong Ka Po (23-20). In 2014, Chong went undefeated in Group II with three wins in singles and one in doubles to help TeamHK secure promotion to Group I for 2015. In 2017, she partnered Katherine Ip to win the deciding doubles against Nigina Abduraimova and Akgul Amanmuradova, 6-7, 6-3, 6-3, to seal a come-from-behind 2-1 victory over Uzbekistan in the final to send Hong Kong up to Group I for the following year's campaign.

Asian Games
At the 18th Asian Games Jakarta-Palembang 2018, Eudice Chong produced the first noteworthy upset when she sent third-seeded Incheon 2014 silver medalist, Luksika Kumkhum, tumbling out in the second round of the women's singles, 4-6, 7-6, 7-6. The HK rep then outplayed Chinese Taipei's No. 14 seed Chang Kai-Chen in straight sets 6-0, 6-2, to set up a quarterfinal meeting with India's No. 1, Ankita Raina. Since a playoff for outright third place was not required, a spot in the semis would guarantee the minimum of a bronze medal. Since tennis was first contested at the third Asian Games in Tokyo 1958, Tsui Yuen Yuen is the only player from Hong Kong to medal in tennis when she claimed a silver in women's doubles in Jakarta 1962 with Ceylon's Ranjani Jayasuriya. However, after jumping out to a 4-1 lead against the world No. 189, she was unable to maintain that advantage, as her opponent fought back from the verge of losing the first set with some high-powered tennis to go through, 6-4, 6-1. In 2014, Chong was also a member of the Hong Kong women's contingent that reached the quarterfinals of the team event in Incheon, South Korea.

World University Games
At the XXX Summer Universiade in Naples, Italy, Chong captured Hong Kong's first-ever medal in singles and then added another bronze in women's doubles together with Maggie Ng. In doing so, she set another precedent as the first player from Hong Kong to medal twice in tennis at the same Universiade. "I'm definitely disappointed that I wasn't able to reach the finals for both events but, at the same time, I'm really happy to have made it through to the medal rounds," Chong reflected. "Representing Hong Kong is always such an honor, and to be able to come home this time with two medals is something I couldn't be prouder of." Chong also competed at Gwangju 2015 and Taipei 2017, where she was one win away from the medal rounds in women's doubles partnering Katherine Ip.

All China Games
In the 2021 Shaanxi edition, Chong reached quarterfinals in women's singles, but lost in first round of women's doubles with Cody Wong.

At the All China Games in 2017, Chong played in the women's team event that saw Hong Kong finish ninth overall among 27 provincial sides. In women's singles, she served for the first set against No. 1 seed Zhang Shuai in the second round with a 6-5 lead and was up a break leading 2-0 in the second before she eventually fell to the world No. 29, 7-6, 6-4. 

In Dalian in 2013, Chong qualified for the maindraw in women's doubles together with Katherine Ip.

Asian Championships
Chong competed in women's doubles partnering Tiffany Wu and reached the quarterfinals in singles at the Toyota Asian Championships 2013 held in Bangkok, Thailand.

Asian Youth Games
Held in Nanjing in 2013, Chong reached the round of 16 in both women's singles and mixed-doubles partnering Andrew Li.

Endorsements and sponsorships
Named its first-ever Tennis Ambassador by The Clearwater Bay Golf & Country Club in 2019, the club providse financial assistance to the 23-year-old. Together, she will help the club promote tennis locally. "It's a huge honor and great opportunity for me. I'm looking forward to spending more time at the club, share my love for the sport, while striving towards my goals on tour," Chong said.

Currently, Chong is sponsored by K-Swiss (shoe and apparel) and Wilson (racquet).

Awards
 Cathay Pacific 2019 Hong Kong Sports Stars Award nominee
 ITA Collegiate All-Star Team 2015-18
 Division III Woman Athlete of the Year Award 2018
 Division III ITA National Senior Player of the Year 2018
 Division III ITA All-America, women's singles 2015-18
 Division III ITA All-America, women's doubles 2015-18
 Division III ITA National Rookie Player of the Year 2015
 NESCAC Player of the Year 2015, 2017-2018
 NESCAC Rookie of the Year 2015
 DIII Honda Athlete of the Year Nominee 2015-18
 ITA James O'Hara Sargent Sportsmanship Award 2015
 Jones Award 2017 and 2018 - Most Outstanding Sportswoman of the Year at Wesleyan University
 International Christian School Nehemiah Award 2014

References

External links
 
 
 

Living people
Hong Kong female tennis players
Tennis players at the 2014 Asian Games
Wesleyan Cardinals athletes
Tennis players at the 2018 Asian Games
College women's tennis players in the United States
Asian Games competitors for Hong Kong
Universiade medalists in tennis
Universiade medalists for Hong Kong
Medalists at the 2019 Summer Universiade
1996 births
Wesleyan University alumni